Ang Ui-jin (born 16 June 1946) is a Taiwanese linguist. He was the chief architect of the Taiwanese Language Phonetic Alphabet and remains a scholar in the progressive reform and development of Taiwanese Hokkien.

Biography
Ang Ui-jin obtained his Bachelor's degree in Chinese Studies from Chinese Culture University in 1969 and his Master's degree from the Chinese Language Research Institute of National Taiwan Normal University in 1973.

He was persecuted during the White Terror and sentenced to life imprisonment for "crimes of rebellion" in 1973. Later, he was granted amnesty and released from prison after 6 years and 8 months.

He then obtained his Ph.D. from the Language Research Institute of National Tsing Hua University.  His research expertises include Min Nan phonetics, dialectology, Chinese phonology, and the sociology of language.

He was once a full-time associate professor at Yuan Ze University. He became dean and full-time professor at the Department of Taiwanese Languages and Literature at National Taichung University in 2006.

He was the 6th President of the Taiwan Linguistics Society.  In 1992 he founded Taiwanese Hokkien magazine Digest of the Taiwanese language.

Ang Ui-jin's oldest son is Mark Ang, the founder of the Formosa Festival of International Filmmaker Awards (FFIFA) and an award-winning director in Taiwan.

Bibliography (Chinese)

See also
Taiwanese Romanization System
Pe̍h-ōe-jī
Taiwanese Hokkien
Hokkien
Taiwanese Hangul

References

External links

Linguists from Taiwan
1946 births
Living people
People from Chiayi County
National Taiwan Normal University alumni
National Tsing Hua University alumni